The Scarborough Sting was a professional women's ice hockey team in the  National Women's Hockey League (NWHL). The team played its home games in Mid Scarborough & Malvern Arena at Scarborough, in Ontario.

History
The Scarborough Sting was founded approximate in 1990's and played in Central Ontario Women's Hockey League (COWHL). The club played several seasons in COWHL. The Scarborough Sting joined the National Women's Hockey League (NWHL) in 1998-99. The first season was difficult: 1 victory, 4 tie and 21 defeats in 40 games. In 1999-2000, surprisingly, the Sting never won at home, collecting all of their points (3 wins and 3 ties) on the road. Thursday, March 30, 2000 Scarborough Sting was face off against Japan National Team in  Stouffville, Ontario: Japan 6-1 Scarborough Sting. In 2000-01, the club re-organized and adopted the new name  Toronto Sting .

Season-by-season

Note: GP = Games played, W = Wins, L = Losses, T = Ties, GF = Goals for, GA = Goals against, Pts = Points.

Season standings

Last current roster 2000-01

Former staff
    General Manager: Karen Spence
    Head Coach: in 1998 Michael Crawford and Blake Broker, in 2000 Merlind Bartley. Brad Williams and Gordon Bullock was assistant coaches

See also
 National Women's Hockey League (1999–2007) (NWHL)

References

External links
 1998-99 Scarborough Sting
 Scarbourough Sharks the intermediate and other young level programs in Scarborough.

Women's ice hockey teams in Canada
Defunct ice hockey teams in Canada
Ice hockey teams in Ontario
National Women's Hockey League (1999–2007) teams
Women in Ontario